Pikermi is a suburb of Athens and a former community of East Attica regional unit, Greece. Since the 2011 local government reform it is part of the municipality Rafina-Pikermi, of which it is a municipal unit. The municipal unit has an area of 21.522 km2.

Geography

Pikermi is situated at the northern edge of the Mesogaia plain, south of the Penteliko Mountain. It is 5 km east of Pallini, 6 km west of Rafina and 19 km east of Athens city centre. Greek National Road 54 (Athens - Rafina) passes through Pikermi. The municipal unit Pikermi consists of the settlements Pikermi, Drafi and Dioni.

Paleontology

Pikermi features a paleontological site which has more than forty mammal species from the late Miocene (8 million years ago). What is special about Pikermi is that it is one of the first Miocene fossil localities to be discovered. It was discovered in 1839 by Bavarian soldiers of king Otto. Since it was one of the first localities, many of the species named there are type species. The locality itself is used as the archetypal example of a 'Pikermian' chronofauna that existed from Afghanistan to the Balkans during the Late Miocene. Similar fossils are found on Samos Island in Greece and Shanxi China.

Historical population

References

External links

GTP Travel Pages (Community)

Populated places in East Attica